The Department of Veterans Affairs Under Secretary's Award in Health Services Research recognizes sustained outstanding accomplishment in health services research among VA scientists.  It is the Department of Veterans Affairs highest honor for a VA health services researcher.,  Selection reflects the following criteria:

 The awardee’s research has added significantly to the understanding of factors that affect the health of America's veterans or has led to a major improvement in the quality of veterans' health care.
 The awardee has made a substantive contribution to the future of VA health services research by inspiring a new generation of investigators and has demonstrated excellence in training and mentorship of young investigators.
 The awardee has enhanced the visibility and reputation of VA research through national leadership in the research community.

Past Awardees
2014 Timothy J. Wilt, MD, MPH
2013 Hayden B. Bosworth, PhD
2012 Elizabeth Martin Yano, PhD, MSPH
2011 Paul G. Shekelle, MD, PhD, MPH
2010 Mary K. Goldstein, MD, MS
2009 H. Gilbert Welch, MD, MPH
2008 David A. Asch, MD, MBA
2007 Douglas Owens, MD, MS
2006 Eugene Oddone, MD
2005 Rod Hayward, MD
2004 Carol M. Ashton, MD, MPH
2003 Morris Weinberger, PhD
2002 Stephan Fihn, MD, MPH
2001 Lisa Rubenstein, MD, MSPH
2000 Nelda Wray, MD, MPH
1999 Rudolf Moos, PhD

References

External links
 VA Health Services Research and Development

United States Department of Veterans Affairs